The 1928 Brisbane City Council election was held on 18 February 1928 to elect the Lord Mayor and councillors for each of the 20 wards of the City of Brisbane.

Results 
The ruling United Party changed its name to Nationalist Civic Party during the preceding term.

References 

1928
1928 elections in Australia
February 1928 events
1920s in Brisbane